Eckart Preu (born 24 August 1969) is an East German-born conductor.

At the age of 10 he became a member, soloist  and assistant conductor of the Boys Choir Dresdner Kreuzchor In Germany he earned a master's degree in Conducting from the Hochschule für Musik in Weimar studying under Gunther Kahlert and Nicolás Pasquet. He also studied under Jean-Sebastien Bereau at the Conservatoire National Supérieur de Musique de Paris in France.

Preu came to the United States as winner of the National Conducting Competition of the German Academic Exchange Service (1996)  for graduate studies with Harold Farberman at the Hartt School of Music. Preu is currently the Music Director of the Portland Symphony Orchestra in Portland, Maine. Preu is the former Music Director of the Spokane Symphony in Spokane, Washington having worked there from 2004-2019. He has also  been music director of the Stamford Symphony in Stamford, Connecticut since 2005. In October 2016, he was named music director for the Cincinnati Chamber Orchestra. For three seasons he was Associate Conductor of the Richmond Symphony. He also served as Resident Conductor with the American Symphony Orchestra and the American Russian Young Artists Orchestra. Former posts include Music Director of the Norwalk Youth Symphony and Principal Conductor of the New Amsterdam Symphony Orchestra (NY).  He was both Assistant and Guest Conductor at the Bard Music Festival. In Europe, Preu served as Music Director of L'Orchestre Internationale de Paris from 1993-95. Eckart Preu is also a frequent guest speaker for local businesses, community organizations and schools. He writes monthly articles for the local newspaper, the Stamford Advocate.

As a guest conductor, he has appeared with the Jerusalem Symphony, the Pecs Philharmonic (Hungary), and in Germany with the Jenaer Philharmonie, the Hallesche Philharmonie, the Thüringer Kammerorchester, and the Landessinfonieorchester Gotha.  Eckart Preu performed at Carnegie Hall in May 1999 and January 2008, and at the Sorbonne in Paris. His concerts have been aired by WPKT Stamford, KPBX Spokane, WCVE Richmond, and Jerusalem Radio. He has collaborated with internationally renowned soloists like Richard Stoltzman, Horacio Gutierrez, Vladimir Feltsman, Jean-Philippe Collard, Leila Josefowicz and Sarah Chang.

References

External links
Eckart Preu's Official website
DAAD/German Academic Exchange Service
Spokane Symphony
New Amsterdam Symphony Orchestra
Stamford Symphony
Recording of Dresdner Kreuzchor

1969 births
German male conductors (music)
Living people
Conservatoire de Paris alumni
University of Hartford Hartt School alumni
German emigrants to the United States
People educated at the Kreuzschule
21st-century German conductors (music)
21st-century German male musicians